Lola Beeth (23 November 1861 – 18 March 1940) was an Austrian operatic soprano, born in Kraków.

Beeth started training as a singer in Lviv, then continued her education with Luise Meyer-Dustmann in Vienna. She also studied in Paris, Milan and Berlin.

Beeth was based in Vienna for much of her career. She debuted as "Elsa" in Lohengrin at the Metropolitan Opera House, on December 2, 1895. She was a member of the Vienna Opera Company who had previous experience singing in Berlin and Paris. As early as the summer of 1892 Beeth appeared at the Vienna Court Opera as Juliet in a production of Gounod's Roméo et Juliette.

Her New York City performance was hampered by nervousness and having never sung the role in the Italian. Beeth sang an aria from La Juive (The Jewess) at the Metropolitan Opera House on January 11, 1896.

Beeth was named as a favorite pupil by Mathilde Marchesi, who tutored her in singing in Paris. After the release of her book, Marchesi and Music, Marchesi planned to visit the United States, but her intended tour was canceled. Beeth died in 1940, in Berlin.

References

External links

 Lola Beeth at Osterreich Kultur retrieved 2/17/2010.
 Lola Beeth photo from Historic Opera website, retrieved on 2/17/2010.

1861 births
1940 deaths
Austrian expatriates in Poland
Austrian operatic sopranos
Musicians from Kraków